Dissin is a town and seat of Dissin Department in the province of Ioba in Burkina Faso, near the northwest corner of Ghana.

References

Populated places in the Sud-Ouest Region (Burkina Faso)